The salamander is an amphibian of the order Urodela which, as with many real creatures, often has been ascribed fantastic and sometimes occult qualities by pre-modern authors (as in the allegorical descriptions of animals in medieval bestiaries) not possessed by the real organism. The legendary salamander is often depicted as a typical salamander in shape with a lizard-like form, but is usually ascribed an affinity with fire, sometimes specifically elemental fire.

Classical, Medieval, and Renaissance lore
This legendary creature embodies the fantastic qualities that ancient and medieval commentators ascribed to the natural salamander. Many of these qualities are rooted in verifiable traits of the natural creature but often exaggerated. A large body of legend, mythology, and symbolism has developed around this creature over the centuries. Carl Linnaeus in the 10th edition of Systema Naturae of 1758 established the scientific description of the salamander and noted the chief characteristics described by the ancients, the reported ability to live in fire and the oily exudates.

Classical lore: Pliny, the Talmud, and Augustine
The salamander was clearly known to the Ancient Greeks by the 4th century BCE, since both Aristotle (384–322 BCE) and his successor Theophrastus (c. 371–c. 287 BCE) refer to the σαλαμάνδρα (salamandra). Theophrastus in particular refers to it as a lizard ("saura") whose emergence is a sign of rain.

The Ancient Greek physician Nicander (2nd century BCE) describes the use of the salamander, the "sorceress’ lizard," in a poisonous potion, and Wallace surmises that a similar reference to grinding up a lizard to produce a love potion by Theocritus (3rd century BCE) may also refer to the salamander.

In one of the earliest surviving descriptions of a salamander, Pliny the Elder (23–79 CE) noted that the creature is "an animal like a lizard in shape and with a body specked all over; it never comes out except during heavy showers and goes away the moment the weather becomes clear." All of these traits, even down to the star-like markings, are consistent with the golden Alpine salamander (Salamandra atra aurorae) of Europe that has golden or yellow spots or blotches on its back and some similarly marked subspecies of the fire salamander (Salamandra salamandra). Pliny even made the important distinction between salamanders and lizards, which are similar in shape but different in other respects, which was not systematized until modern times, when biologists classified lizards as reptiles and salamanders as amphibians.

Pliny recounts several other traits which are less credible, such as the ability to extinguish fire with the frigidity of their bodies, a quality which was reported as hearsay by Aristotle. While Pliny notes this in Book 10, Chapter 86 of the Natural History, in Book 29, Chapter 23 of the same work he views this idea with skepticism, pointing out that if such an idea were true, it should be easy to demonstrate. Pliny likewise reports (Book 29, Chapter 76) that his contemporary Sextius Niger denied the idea that salamanders could extinguish fire, though Sextius also believed they had aphrodisiac qualities when properly prepared and consumed.

Pliny also notes medicinal and poisonous properties, which are founded in fact on some level, since many species of salamander, including fire salamanders and Alpine salamanders, excrete toxic, physiologically active substances. These substances are often excreted when the animal is threatened, which has the effect of deterring predators. The extent of these properties is greatly exaggerated though, with a single salamander being regarded as so toxic that by twining around a tree it could poison the fruit and so kill any who ate them and by falling into a well could slay all who drank from it.

Roughly contemporary with Pliny is a bas-relief of a salamander straddling the cross-beam of a balance scale in an anvil-and-forge scene found in the ruins of the Roman town of Pompeii. Bodson identifies the animal as Salamandra salamandra, the familiar fire salamander, and suspects that it might have been a sign for a blacksmith's shop.

A few centuries later (late 2nd–early 3rd century CE), Greek-speaking Roman author Aelian describes salamanders as being drawn to the fires of forges and quenching them, to the annoyance of the blacksmiths. Aelian is also careful to note that the salamander is not born of fire itself, unlike the pyrausta. 

The salamander is also mentioned in the Talmud (Hagiga 27a) as a creature that is a product of fire and it relates that anyone who is smeared with its blood will be immune to harm from fire. Rashi (1040–1105), the primary commentator on the Talmud, describes the salamander as one which is produced by burning a fire in the same place for seven consecutive days.

Saint Augustine in the City of God used the example of salamanders to argue for the possibility of humans being punished by being burned in eternal flame in Purgatory. He wrote "If, therefore, the salamander lives in fire, as naturalists have recorded, and if certain famous mountains of Sicily have been continually on fire from the remotest antiquity until now, and yet remain entire, these are sufficiently convincing examples that everything which burns is not consumed."

Medieval lore

After the end of the Classical era, depictions of the salamander became more fantastic and stylized, often retaining little resemblance to the animal described by ancient authors. In Medieval European bestiaries, fanciful depictions of salamanders include "a satyr-like creature in a circular wooden tub" (8th century), "a worm penetrating flames" (12th century), "a winged dog" (13th century), and "a small bird in flames" (13th century).

A frequently-cited illustration of a salamander is presented in an influential 20th-century occult work by Manly P. Hall, Secret Teachings of All Ages, in which it is attributed to Paracelsus. This illustration appears to originate in a 1527 anti-papal tract by Andreas Osiander and Hans Sachs, where it is identified as "the Pope as a monster". Its association with Paracelsus derives from his Auslegung der Magischen Figuren im Carthäuser Kloster zu Nũrnberg in which the author presents explanations of some illustrations found in a Carthusian monastery in Nuremberg; the illustration in question he labels as "a salamander or desolate worm with a human head and crowned with a crown and a pope hat thereon," which is later explained to represent the Pope. Catholic Archbishop Raymund Netzhammer (1862–1945) explained that the set of woodcuts it belongs to was commissioned by Osiander based on some old "pope illustrations" found at the monastery, which Netzhammer thought may have dated back to the time of Joachim of Fiore (d. 1202) and were intended as cartoons mocking the Pope and the Church.

Renaissance lore: Europe

Compared to Medieval depictions, Renaissance depictions are characteristically more realistic, adhering more closely to the Classical description. In another example, a 1556 edition of the Book of Lambspring depicts the salamander as a white bird, while Lucas Jennis' 1625 version of the same illustration, included in the Musaeum Hermeticum, depicts it as a lizard-like animal with star-like markings (see right).

Of all the traits ascribed to salamanders, the ones relating to fire have stood out most prominently. This connection probably originates from a behavior common to many species of salamander: hibernating in and under rotting logs. When wood was brought indoors and put on the fire, the creatures "mysteriously" appeared from the flames. The 16th-century Italian artist Benvenuto Cellini (1500–1571) famously recalled witnessing just such an appearance as a child in his autobiography. According to some writers, the milky substance that a salamander exudes when frightened and which makes its skin moist gave rise to the idea that the salamander could withstand any heat and even put out fires.

Another idea which is found in several Medieval and Renaissance works was that "Egyptian priests" used a hieroglyph which applied the figure of a salamander to represent a man who is burnt, or in other versions a man who has died from cold. This tradition is first found in the Hieroglyphica of Horapollo (Book 2, Ch. LXII), but it is not now considered to be an authentic representation of hieroglyphic usage.

Early commentators in Europe often grouped "crawling things" (reptiles or reptilia in Latin) together and thus creatures in this group, which typically included salamanders (Latin salamandrae), dragons (Latin dracones or serpentes), and basilisks (Latin basilisci), were often associated, as in Conrad Lycosthenes' Prodigiorum ac ostentorum chronicon of 1557.

Leonardo da Vinci (1452–1519) wrote the following on the salamander: "This has no digestive organs, and gets no food but from the fire, in which it constantly renews its scaly skin. The salamander, which renews its scaly skin in the fire,—for virtue." Later, Paracelsus (1493–1541) suggested that salamanders were the elementals of fire, which has had substantial influence on the role of salamanders in the occult. Paracelsus, contrary to the prevalent belief at the time, considered salamanders to be not devils, but similar to humans, only lacking a soul (along with giants, dwarves, mermaids, elves, and elemental spirits in human form). Francis I of France used the salamander as his symbol.

The salamander is found throughout French folklore, although in differing form. In addition or sometimes instead of its fire symbolism, it was attributed a powerful poison. Some legends say that merely by falling into a well, it would poison the water, and by climbing a fruit tree, poison the fruit. Its highly toxic breath was reportedly enough to swell a person until their skin broke; in Auvergne, it supposedly did the same to herds of cattle. This gained it the name of "bellows breath". Like the real animal, the legendary salamander breathed seldom; unlike the real salamander, the only way to kill one was said to be to lock it in a confined space so that it breathed its own poison. The Bretons feared it so they did not dare say its real name for fear it would hear and then kill them.

Renaissance: Asian garments
Early travelers to China were shown garments supposedly woven from salamander hair or wool; the cloth was completely unharmed by fire. The garments had actually been woven from asbestos. 
According to T. H. White, Prester John had a robe made from it; the "Emperor of India" possessed a suit made from a thousand skins; and Pope Alexander III had a tunic which he valued highly. William Caxton (1481) wrote: "This Salemandre berithe wulle, of which is made cloth and gyrdles that may not brenne in the fyre." 

Holme (1688) wrote: "...I have several times put [salamander hair] in the Fire and made it red hot and after taken it out, which being cold, yet remained perfect wool."

An alternative interpretation was that this material was a kind of silk: A 12th-century letter supposedly from Prester John says, "Our realm yields the worm known as the salamander. Salamanders live in fire and make cocoons, which our court ladies spin and use to weave cloth and garments. To wash and clean these fabrics, they throw them into flames." Friar also notes that Marco Polo believed that the "true" salamander was an incombustible substance found in the earth.

In heraldry

In European heraldry, the salamander is typically depicted as either a lizard or a dragon within a blazing fire. Francis I of France used a salamander as his personal emblem.

Newts in witchcraft
A newt is a type of salamander and their name is traditionally associated with witchcraft.

Use of name
The beast's ability to withstand fire has led to its name being applied to a variety of heating devices, including space heaters, ovens and cooking and blacksmithing devices, dating back at least to the 17th century.

See also
 Gnome
 Lurchi
 Sylph
 Undine

References

Salamanders
Legendary amphibians
Medieval European legendary creatures
Elementals
Legendary creatures in classical mythology
European dragons
Fire in culture
Cultural depictions of animals